The legal status of cryptocurrencies varies substantially from one jurisdiction to another, and is still undefined or changing in many of them. Whereas, in the majority of countries the usage of cryptocurrency isn't in itself illegal, its status and usability as a means of payment (or a commodity) varies, with differing regulatory implications.

While some states have explicitly allowed its use and trade, others have banned or restricted it. Likewise, various government agencies, departments, and courts have classified cryptocurrencies differently.

Detail by intergovernmental organization

Detail by country or territory

Alphabetical index to classifications

 Algeria
 Argentina
 Australia
 Austria
 Bangladesh
 Belarus
 Belgium
 Bolivia
 Bosnia and Herzegovina
 Brazil
 Bulgaria
 Cambodia
 Canada
 Chile
 China (Hong Kong SAR)
 Colombia
 Costa Rica
 Croatia
 Cyprus
 Czech Republic
 Denmark
 Ecuador
 Egypt
 Estonia
 Finland
 France
 Georgia
 Germany
 Greece
 Hungary
 Iceland
 India
 Indonesia
 Iran
 Ireland
 Italy
 Israel
 Jamaica
 Japan
 Jordan
 Kosovo
 Kyrgyzstan
 Korea (South)
 Lebanon
 Lithuania
 Luxembourg
 Macedonia
 Malaysia
 Malta
 Mexico
 Namibia
 Nepal
 Netherlands
 New Zealand
 Nicaragua
 Niger
 Nigeria
 Norway
 Pakistan
 Philippines
 Poland
 Portugal
 Romania
 Russia
 Saudi Arabia
 Singapore
 Slovakia
 Slovenia
 South Africa
 Spain
 Sweden
 Switzerland
 Taiwan
 Thailand
 Trinidad and Tobago
 Turkey
 United Arab Emirates
 United Kingdom
 United States
 Uzbekistan
 Venezuela
 Vietnam
 Zimbabwe

Africa

Northern Africa

Western Africa

East & Central Africa

Southeast Africa

Horn of Africa

Indian Ocean States

Southern Africa

Americas

North America

Central America

Caribbean

South America

Asia

Central Asia

West Asia

South Asia

East Asia

Southeast Asia

Europe

Central Europe

Eastern Europe

Northern Europe

Southern Europe

Western Europe

Oceania

Australasia

Melanesia

Micronesia

Polynesia

See also
Regulation of algorithms
Taxation of cryptocurrency splits
Bitcoin Law
Anti-bitcoin law protests

Footnotes

References

External links
 Regulation of Bitcoin in Selected Jurisdictions - law.gov

Bitcoin
Digital currencies
Financial cryptography
Currency legislation
Comparative law
Cryptocurrencies
Law by country
Bitcoin
Lists by country